Garanti BBVA (legal name Türkiye Garanti Bankası A.Ş; formerly referred to as Garanti Bank in English) is a Turkish financial services company based in Turkey. 86% of Garanti's stakes are owned by the Spanish bank Banco Bilbao Vizcaya Argentaria (BBVA).

Overview 
Garanti Bank is the second largest private bank in Turkey with US$104.1 billion consolidated assets as of March 31, 2013.  Having shares publicly traded in Turkey, the UK and the US, Garanti has an actual free float of 50.76% as of March 31, 2013; Garanti shares are publicly traded in Turkey and depository receipts in the UK and the US.

Garanti provides services in all business lines including payment systems, retail, commercial, corporate, SME, private and investment banking. Together with its domestic and international subsidiaries (Garanti Bank International, Garanti Bank SA, Garanti Bank Moscow), Garanti offers service also in pension and life insurance, leasing, factoring, brokerage and asset management.

Garanti serves twelve million customers through 872 domestic branches, 7 foreign branches in Cyprus and one in Malta; 2 international representative offices in Düsseldorf and Shanghai; more than 5,290 ATMs; an award winning call center and Internet, mobile and social banking platforms built on technological infrastructure.

Ownership
The shares of the stock of Garanti Bank are traded on the Borsa Istanbul, LSE and OTCQX. The shareholding in the bank's stock is as depicted in the table below:

Member companies
The companies that comprise the Garanti Bank Group include, but are not limited to, the following:
 Garanti Bank International N.V.
 Garanti Bank Moscow
 Garanti Bank Romania
 Garanti Asset Management
 Garanti Securities
 Garanti Pension
 Garanti Leasing
 Garanti Factoring
 Garanti Payment Systems
 Garanti Mortgage
 Garanti Technology

References

Sources

External links
 

Turkish brands
Banks established in 1946
Banks of Turkey
Companies listed on the Istanbul Stock Exchange
Companies based in Istanbul
Doğuş Group
Banco Bilbao Vizcaya Argentaria
Turkish companies established in 1946